Lydstep Haven, known in ancient times as Lis Castell, is an area in Pembrokeshire, Wales, in the community of Manorbier. Both the beach and caravan park are what is known as Lydstep Haven. Reached via the A4139 from Tenby and Pembroke.

The hamlet of Lydstep contains the Grade I listed ruins of a "Bishop's Palace" across from the road from the Lydstep Tavern. Although called a palace, it is understood to have been the hunting seat of Lord St David in the early 14th century. Cadw describe it as a medieval house containing a first-floor hall and possible parlour, and vaulted undercroft in two unequal sections, constructed of limestone masonry with slate roof. Traditionally known as the 'Place of Arms', its name perhaps became mutated to 'palace' and was probably where the manorial court of Manorbier and Penally was held.

References

External links

Historical information and sources on GENUKI

Beaches of Pembrokeshire
Coast of Pembrokeshire
Villages in Pembrokeshire
Seaside resorts in Wales